Warbound is the second album by Christian death metal band Broken Flesh.

Critical reception

The Metal Resource writes, "As a band, the performances on this album are great. Many bands in this genre end up with all their songs sounding the same by the time everything is put together, but that is not the case here, which makes this a good listen. Guitar riffs are fast and show good variety; the drumming shows great speed as one would expect in the genre, but also some great variety fills, tempo changes, and double bass work; vocals are not simply all guttural death metal style and are delivered with a sense of strength; and even the bass guitar that is often largely absent from the mix in this genre contributes to the overall sound."

Artwork and concept
When asked in an interview with HM Magazine if Warbound was a concept album, Guitarist Kevin Tubby replied

Track listing

Personnel
Broken Flesh
 Jacob Mathes – vocals
 Josh Mathes – bass, vocals
 Steve Giddens – guitar
 Kevin Tubby – guitar, vocals
 Brandon Lopez – drums

Production
 Provo Provenzano – producer, mastering, engineer, mixing
 Jon Zig – artwork

References

2013 albums
Broken Flesh albums